The Hudson Stakes was an American Thoroughbred horse race first run in 1887 at Gravesend Race Track in Gravesend, New York. A race for two-year-old horses of either sex, it was run on dirt over a distance of five furlongs. 

The Hudson Stakes carries the name of the early 17th century explorer, Henry Hudson, for whom New York's Hudson River was named. An annual event, the it was last run at the Gravesend track in 1910, at a time when New York state racetrack owners were struggling to survive following the June 11, 1908 passage of the Hart–Agnew anti-betting legislation. Implemented by the Republican controlled New York Legislature under Governor Charles Evans Hughes. the law contained penalties that allowed for fines and up to a year in prison. Further restrictive legislation was passed by the New York Legislature in 1910 which deepened the financial crisis for track operators and led to a complete shutdown of racing across the state during 1911 and 1912.  A February 21, 1913 ruling by the New York Supreme Court, Appellate Division saw horse racing return in 1913. However, it was too late for the Gravesend horse racing facility and it never reopened.

In 1914 the running of the Hudson Stakes was taken up by Aqueduct Racetrack in Queens, New York.
It was won by Sea Shell under jockey Joe McCahey who would go on to win that year's national riding title with the most purse money won by any American jockey.

Historical race notes
The 1918 edition of the Hudson Stakes saw the Aqueduct track record for five furlongs on dirt broken when High Time won in a time  58 2/5.  High Time would have a very successful career at stud, becoming the Leading sire in North America in 1928 and the Leading broodmare sire in North America in 1936 and again in 1940.

The legendary Man o' War won the 1919 Hudson Stakes carrying at least 15 pounds more than any of his rivals. Although on a track rated as fast, he winning time of 1:01 3/5 was the slowest of any winner during the 19 years it was hosted by the Aqueduct track.

The Great Depression brought difficult times once again for Thoroughbred racing and it would lead to the final running of the Hudson Stakes taking place on June 18, 1932. The event was won by Jerome H. Louchheim's Sandy Bill in a time of 58 seconds, the fastest in the history of the race.

In 1978, Belmont Park revived usage of the Hudson name with the Hudson Handicap, a mile race for New York-bred horses age three and older. It has since been renamed the Hudson Stakes.

Records
Speed record:
 0:58 flat @ 5 furlongs: Sandy Bill (1932)

Most wins by a jockey:
 3 – Linus McAtee (1923, 1926, 1930)
 3 – Laverne Fator (1928, 1929, 1931)

Most wins by a trainer:
 4 – Sam Hildreth (1898, 1917, 1928, 1929)

Most wins by an owner:
 4 – Harry P. Whitney (1916, 1923, 1924, 1926)

Winners

References

Flat horse races for two-year-olds
Gravesend Race Track
Aqueduct Racetrack
Discontinued horse races in New York City
Recurring sporting events established in 1887
Recurring sporting events disestablished in 1933